Idne, also known as Maleu-Kilenge, is an Austronesian language spoken by several thousand swidden farmers in the Talasea District of West New Britain Province, Papua New Guinea.

References

Ngero–Vitiaz languages
Languages of West New Britain Province